The Florida Sentinel Bulletin is a Florida bi-weekly newspaper serving the Tampa Bay Area African-American community.

History
In 1919, General William W. Andrews opened the Florida Sentinel office in Jacksonville, Florida. Later, the office closed due to the Great Depression. In 1945, General Andrews's son, C. Blythe Andrews, re-opened the Florida Sentinel at 1511 Central Avenue in Tampa, Florida. 

In 1959, C. Blythe Andrews bought the Tampa Bulletin newspaper, and merged the two newspapers to make the Florida Sentinel Bulletin. In 1962, the newspaper office was moved to 2207 East 21st Avenue in the Ybor City district of Tampa, Florida. The C. Blythe Andrews Jr. Public Library was named for the publisher.

References

External links
 Florida Sentinel Bulletin web site
University of South Florida Libraries: Florida Sentinel Bulletin Collection In 2012, the University of South Florida Library began retrospectively digitizing issues of the Florida Sentinel Bulletin in its collection. This is an ongoing project, with more issues added periodically.

Newspapers published in Florida
Newspapers established in 1919
Mass media in the Tampa Bay area
African-American newspapers
1919 establishments in Florida